Condition Critical is the fourth studio album by American heavy metal band Quiet Riot. Released in 1984, it was not nearly as successful as its predecessor (1983's Metal Health) in either fan reaction or sales. However, it did sell over one million copies, peaking at  15 on the US Billboard album chart. Like the band's previous album, Condition Critical features a Slade cover song as the second track.

Tracks "Party All Night" (also known as "Party All Nite") and "Mama Weer All Crazee Now" had music videos made for them, both receiving some airplay on TV. The same man with a metal mask from the last album cover is on this cover as well as many of the band's subsequent album covers, establishing him as the band's mascot. The character also has cameos in both aforementioned music videos.

The track "Stomp Your Hands, Clap Your Feet" shares its title with the original American title to Slade's 1974 album Old New Borrowed and Blue.

Critical reception

As stated in the program Behind the Music, frontman DuBrow's combative attitude towards music journalists and fellow metal musicians – for example, he likened the magazine Hit Parader to toilet paper – was felt by other band members and their producer to have hurt the album's reviews. DuBrow later agreed and expressed regret.

Allmusic critic Stephen Thomas Erlewine gave Condition Critical a mixed-to-positive review, stating that he found the band's Slade cover to be the best track on the album given the "solid hook" of its guitar riffs.

Musician reviewer J. D. Considine wrote simply: "Prognosis: Terminal."

Commercial performance
The album did not garner the same amount of sales as its predecessor, Metal Health. It reached the No. 15 slot on the Billboard 200.

Track listing
All songs written by Kevin DuBrow, except where noted.

Personnel

Quiet Riot
Kevin DuBrow – lead vocals
Carlos Cavazo – guitars
Rudy Sarzo – bass guitar
Frankie Banali – drums

Additional Personnel
Chuck Wright - backing vocals
Randy Bishop - backing vocals

Production
Spencer Proffer – producer
Duane Baron – engineer
Jay Vigon – art direction, design

Charts

Certifications

References

Quiet Riot albums
1984 albums
Pasha Records albums